Lanhsa (Línea Aérea Nacional de Honduras S.A.), is an airline in Honduras operating scheduled and charter service.

Destinations 
La Ceiba's Golosón International Airport (LCE)
Roatan's Juan Manuel Gálvez International Airport (RTB)
Guanaja's Guanaja Airport (GJA)
Tegucigalpa's Toncontín International Airport (TGU)
San Pedro Sula (SAP) – Ramón Villeda Morales International Airport                                                               
Puerto Lempira's Puerto Lempira Airport, (PEU)

Fleet 
As of August 2019:
BAe Jetstream 31 - 5 aircraft 
BAe Jetstream 41  - 1 aircraft

External links 
 Official website

References

Airlines of Honduras